Ji Seung-Hyun (born 7 January 1979) is a Korean handball player who competed in the 2004 Summer Olympics.

References

1979 births
Living people
South Korean male handball players
Olympic handball players of South Korea
Handball players at the 2004 Summer Olympics